SHS-23 Aeromovel Indonesia, Titihan Samirono (Javanese for "wind transport") or Kereta Layang (Indonesian for "elevated train") is a people mover system at Taman Mini Indonesia Indah (TMII) in Jakarta, Indonesia. The 3.2 km system is entirely elevated with tracks situated 6 meters above the ground and loops around the park.

The people mover was formerly using the wind-powered aeromovel technology developed by Oskar H.W. Coester from Brazil. It was opened in 1989 as the world's first installation of aeromovel system. In late 2010s, the system underwent major refurbishment, with conversion of a vehicle to be powered by an onboard diesel engine.  The vehicle runs on the original guideway but without using the airduct.  Two other vehicles were retired.  The remodeled attraction was launched on 19 March 2019.

History
SHS-23 Aeromovel Indonesia was launched in April 1989. The name Titihan Samirono was given by the second Indonesian president Suharto, whose wife Siti Hartinah is the park's founder. The system was built by local contractor PT Citra Patenindo Nusa Pratama, a company owned by Suharto's daughter Siti Hardiyanti Rukmana (Tutut Soeharto).

SHS-23 Aeromovel Indonesia was considered an "advanced technology" for its time, as well as a prototype for urban public transport in the future. It is the first light rail system in the country, preceding Palembang LRT (and subsequently, specifically in Jakarta, Jakarta LRT) which were opened decades later.

As of 2014, SHS-23 Aeromovel Indonesia is only operated during the weekends, due to the high number of visitors (thus high train occupancy) and the large operational costs.

The system was closed temporarily on the unknown date. The aeromovel system then known to be replaced into conventional, driver-controlled system and its decades-old trainsets are retrofitted. The system was relaunched on 19 March 2019 by Tutut Soeharto, this time as chairman of the then TMII operator Harapan Kita Foundation; currently more promoted as Kereta Layang or Titihan Samirono than "aeromovel".

Currently, the existence of the SHS-23 Aeromovel Indonesia is being replaced by a Tram Mover made by PT INKA which will be fully operational on January 1, 2023 after the total renovation of TMII.

Operations
When still operating as an aeromovel, SHS-23 Aeromovel Indonesia used three single-articulated trainsets. These motorless, driverless vehicle operate in the line simultaneously. Each vehicle consists of two compartments with full internal access. Two vehicles were designed to carry 104 seated passengers and the third one was designed for 48 seated and 252 standing passengers. The vehicles has a speed of 15–20 km/h, though the vehicle actually could speed into 60 km/h. The speed is considered ideal because of the short track length and to allowing passengers to have longer time to see the panoramic view of Taman Mini Indonesia Indah more comfortably and safely.

Currently, as of early 2020 there is a single, articulated, air-conditioned train operating in the system. The outer frame of old vehicle is unchanged, while the inner system is manufactured by INKA. The train is retrofitted with diesel engines, making it more like a diesel multiple unit.

Stations
The system has six stations located across TMII. Some of them may be closed.
 Taman Budaya (Culture Park): Located beside Tanah Airku Theater, Taman Budaya is the westernmost station in the system and the first station seen when the visitors visit the park. The station is close to the mini train station.
 Taman Nusa (Islands Park): Located in front of North Sumatra pavilion, Taman Nusa is situated off the coast of Indonesian archipelago lake.
 Taman Anggrek (Orchid Park): Located nearby Maluku pavilion, Taman Nusa is situated off the coast of Indonesian archipelago lake.
 Taman Burung (Bird Park): Located in front of Taman Burung bird park, the station is close to the Pusat Peragaan Ilmu Pengetahuan dan Teknologi (Center of Science and Technology Demonstration). Transfer is available to a skylift station via short walk.
 Taman Wisata (Tourism Park): Located in front of Southeast Sulawesi pavilion, the station is close to the Museum Transportasi (Museum of Transport), Museum Komodo and Taman Reptil (Reptile Park).
 Taman Bunga Keong Emas (Keong Emas Floral Park): Located off the coast of the Taman Akuarium Air Tawar (Freshwater Aquarium Park) lake, the station is close to the Taman Legenda Keong Emas (Golden Snail Legend Park) as well as Keong Emas IMAX theatre.

References

External links
 SHS-23 Aeromovel Indonesia/Titihan Samirono on TMII website

Operating amusement attractions
People mover systems in Indonesia
Transport in Jakarta
Taman Mini Indonesia Indah
Amusement rides introduced in 1989